The Amurdak, people, also written Amarak and Ngamarak,  are an indigenous Australian people of the Cobourg Peninsula in the Northern Territory.

Language

The language of the Amarak, Amurdak, is now virtually extinct, the last known speaker being Charlie Mungulda. It was also known as Wardadjbak, and belongs to the Iwaidja language family. It had two dialects, Urrik and Didjurra.

Country
The Amurdak's traditional lands extended over some  around the eastern coast of Van Diemen Gulf. Their northern extend lay beyond Murgenella Creek and in the vicinity of Cooper Creek, while their southern frontier was close to the East Alligator River.

Mythology

According to the widespread creation story of the Cobourg Peninsula dreamtime, the Amurdak (Umoriu) descended from Imberombera deposited who children at a place near Cooper Creek known as Mamul. One of the children was called Kominuuru, and, on leaving, she told them to speak Amurdak, and an edible bulb called .

Alternative names
 Amarag, Amuruk, Amurag, Amurrak
 Ngamurak, Ngamurag, Nga:mu:rak
 Umoriu
 Monobar (?)
 A'moordiyu
 Amardak
 Amurdag
 Amurtak
 Amuruk
 Mamurug
 Namurug
 Umoreo
 Umorrdak
 Wardadjbak
 Woraidbug
 Wureidbug

Notes

Citations

Sources

Aboriginal peoples of the Northern Territory